Batrachorhina niviscutata is a species of beetle in the family Cerambycidae. It was described by Johan Christian Fabricius in 1901. It is known from Madagascar.

References

Batrachorhina
Beetles described in 1901